The 2011 Jersey general election was held on 19 October 2011 to elect 45 members of the States Assembly. This was the first time Senators, Deputies and Constables were elected on a single day in Jersey. The number of members of the States of Jersey was reduced from 53 to 51. Six Senators who had been elected in 2008 for a period of six years did not face election in 2011.

Nominations 

Nominations for candidates took place on 6 September at the Town Hall, St Helier, Jersey for the four Senatorial seats and at each parish hall on 7 September for the twelve Constable and twenty nine Deputy seats.

Senatorial elections

Results

Four Senators were elected.
Sir Philip Bailhache 17,538
Deputy Ian Gorst 15,614
Senator Francis Le Gresley 14,981
Lyndon Farnham 11,095
Advocate Rose Colley 8,253
Senator Freddie Cohen 7,922
Stuart Syvret 6,402
Mark Forskitt 2,813
Linda Corby 2,489
David Richardson 1,570
Darius Pearce 1,562
Sylvia Lagadu 1,332
Chris Whitworth 1,296

Incumbents 
Prior to the October elections, there are six incumbents.
Senator Ben Shenton did not seek re-election
Senator Francis Le Gresley
 Senator Terry Le Main: did not seek re-election as senator but stood for deputy in St Helier No. 2 district
 Senator Freddie Cohen
 Senator Jim Perchard did not seek re-election
 Senator Terry Le Sueur, a former Chief Minister, did not seek re-election

Deputy Elections

St Helier
St Helier returned ten deputies in total to the States of Jersey, three from district one, three from district two and four from districts three and four.

District One

Three candidates were elected in this district. The voter turnout was 37.9%.
James Baker 767 (42%)
Deputy Trevor Pitman 763 (42%)
Deputy Judy Martin 717 (40%)
Deputy Paul Le Claire 700 (39%)
Nick Le Cornu 571 (32%)
Keith Shaw 482 (26%)
Mary O'Keeffe-Burgher 331 (18%)
Gino Risoli 178 (10%)

Incumbents
Deputy Paul Le Claire
Deputy Judy Martin
Deputy Trevor Pitman

District Two

Three candidates were elected in the No. 2 district. The voter turnout was 37.25%.
Rod Bryans 763 (45%)
Deputy Shona Pitman 743 (44%)
Deputy Geoff Southern 694 (41%)
Senator Terry Le Main 593 (35%)
Deputy Debbie De Sousa 579 (34%)
Hugh Rammond 430 (25%)
Bernard Manning 282 (16%)

Incumbents
Deputy Geoff Southern
Deputy Shona Pitman
Deputy Debbie de Sousa

District Three & Four

Four candidates were elected in district no. 3. The voter turnout was 40.5%.
Deputy Jackie Hilton 1,941 (57%)
Deputy Andrew Green 1,924 (56%)
Richard Rondel 1,870 (55%)
Deputy Mike Higgins 1,464 (43%)
Suzette Hase 1,158 (34%)
Denise Carroll MBE 874 (26%)
Ted Vibert 865 (25%)
Ray Shead 799 (23%)

Incumbents
Deputy Jackie Hilton
Deputy Andrew Green
Deputy Mike Higgins
Deputy Ben Fox

St Saviour

District One
Two candidates were elected in this district.
Deputy Rob Duhamel 773 (34%)
Deputy Jeremy Maçon 621 (28%)
Hedi Green 462 (20%)
Isabella Lewis 400 (18%)

District Two
Two candidates were elected in this district.
Deputy Tracey Vallois
Deputy Kevin Lewis
Shelley Rose

District Three

Nominated Candidates
Deputy Roy Le Hérissier
Charlie Gouyet

St Brelade
St Brelade returned three deputies to the States of Jersey, two from district two and one from district one.

District One
Nominated Candidates
Deputy Angela Jeune
Jeff Hathaway
Margaret Holland Prior
John Young

Incumbent
Deputy Angela Jeune

District Two
Nominated Candidates
Mervyn Le Masurier
Deputy Montfort Tadier
Deputy Sean Power

Incumbents
Deputy Montfort Tadier
Deputy Sean Power

St Clement
Nominated Candidates
Deputy Anne Dupré
Peter Ward
Susan Pinel
David Cabeldu
Gerard Baudains
Simon Brée

St Lawrence
Deputy John Le Fondré (Elected unopposed)
Deputy Eddie Noel (Elected unopposed)

St Peter

Nominated Candidates
Kristina Moore
Wayne Le Marquand

St John
One candidate was elected.
Patrick Ryan 528 (45%)
Andrew Lewis 437 (37%)
David Ward 205 (18%)

Trinity
Deputy Anne Pryke (Elected unopposed)

St Martin
Nominated Candidates
Deputy Bob Hill
Steve Luce

Grouville
Nominated Candidates
Deputy Carolyn Labey
Dominic Jones

St Ouen
Nominated Candidates
Deputy James Reed
Chris Lamy
Alan Le Quesne
Cliff Le Clercq

St Mary
Nominated Candidates
Ray Cooper
John Le Bailly
David Johnson

Constable Elections
Each Parish of the island of Jersey elects one Constable who is both a member of the States of Jersey and head of the Parish Municipality, the Constable acts at both national and regional political levels. The Constable is often referred to as the Father of the Parish.

St Helier

St Saviour

St Brelade

St Clement

St Lawrence

St Peter

St John

Trinity

St Martin

Grouville

St Ouen
For the first time since 1903 the position of Constable in the Parish of St Ouen will be contested following the decision of incumbent Ken Vibert to stand down.

Candidates
Michael Paddock
Richard Renouf

St Mary

Municipal Elections
Municipal elections took place in November 2011 for the election of Procureur du Bien Public, Roads Inspectors, Rates Assessors, Honorary Police, Roads Committee & Accounts Committee. These elections are generally uncontested.

References

External links

General 2011
2011 elections in Europe
2011 in Jersey
October 2011 events in Europe